Pandit Narendra Sharma (28 February 1913 – 12 February 1989) was an Indian writer, poet and lyricist in Hindi language. He also wrote some songs for Indian Hindi cinema, like the title song for Satyam Shivam Sundaram (1979), for which he also received a Filmfare Award nomination for Best Lyricist.

Life and career
Pandit Narendra Sharma was born in Jahangirpur near Proposed International Airport Jewer, Greater Noida, District Gautam Buddh Nagar Uttar Pradesh in the National Capital Region. He did his undergraduate program and M.A in English Literature at Allahabad University.

Lata Mangeshkar the singer used to address him as her father while she was addressed as his daughter. In a documentary on Lata Mangeshkar produced and directed by Nasreen Munni Kabir for Britain's Channel 4 the singer has confessed that she learned a lot from pandithji and could negotiate many difficulties of life based on his advice.

He published Abyudhay newspaper in 1934. His first Hindi film was Hamari Baat(1943). He was founder of Vividh Bharati Seva  of All India Radio.

He is best known for composing the title track to Raj Kapoor's Satyam Shivam Sundaram. The philosophical lyrics weave a message about beauty, truth, and their divinity. He received his first Filmfare Award nomination for the popularity and complexity of this song.

Sharma wrote for more than hundred films and worked with almost all major music directors and singers. He was also the conceptual adviser of the popular TV Series Mahabharat, for which too he wrote songs. This was his last work, and on 12 February 1989, four months after the show went on-air, he died aged 76, 16 days before his 77th birthday.

Bibliography
The following are the poems written by Narendra Sharma
 Kahani Kehte Kehte
 Paniharin
 Rathwan
 Swagatham

Filmography
 Subah (1982)
Prem Rog (1982)
 Satyam Shivam Sundaram (1978)
Phir Bhi (1971)
Bhabhi Ki Chudiyan (1961)
Radha Krishna (1954)
 Aandhiyan (1952)
Malti Madhav (1951)
Sagar (1951)
 Afsar (1950)
Narasinha Avatar (1949)
 Matwala Shair (1947)
 Jwar Bhata (1944)
Hamari Baat (1943)

References

External links
Pandit Narendra Sharma on IMDb
Narendra Sharma's songs in Hindi Films
Profile and Poems at anubhuti-hindi.org
Pandit Narendra Sharma, Life  
and works, at study (Hindi)

Indian male poets
1913 births
1989 deaths
People from Bulandshahr district
Indian lyricists
Hindi-language poets
University of Allahabad alumni
20th-century Indian poets
Poets from Uttar Pradesh
20th-century Indian male writers